Lichanothrips is a genus of thrips in the family Phlaeothripidae.

Species
 Lichanothrips albus
 Lichanothrips calcis
 Lichanothrips curvatus
 Lichanothrips magnificus
 Lichanothrips metopus
 Lichanothrips pastinus
 Lichanothrips pulchra
 Lichanothrips semifuscipennis
 Lichanothrips triquetrus
 Lichanothrips xouthus

References

Phlaeothripidae
Thrips
Thrips genera